The Harrison Stuckslager House is a historic building located in Lisbon, Iowa, United States.  A Pennsylvania native, Stuckslager permanately settled in Linn County in 1866 where he became a prominent farmer and banker.  He had this two-story, brick vernacular Italianate house built in 1876.  It features bracketed eaves, decorative window hoods, projecting bays, and elaborate porches.  The house remains on a full block north of Lisbon's central business district that includes the former carriage barn and storage shed, a small horse pasture, the remains of an orchard, and gardens.  The house was listed on the National Register of Historic Places in 1979.

References

Houses completed in 1876
Italianate architecture in Iowa
Houses in Linn County, Iowa
National Register of Historic Places in Linn County, Iowa
Houses on the National Register of Historic Places in Iowa
Lisbon, Iowa